The Humanist Party was a political party in Denmark and is a member of the Humanist International. 

The party was established in 1987 and participated the general election held that year. The last time the party went for general elections in Denmark was 1993. At the beginning of the 2000s the party was headed by Christian Adamsen. It stood in the regional and municipal elections in Denmark 15 November 2005. 

The region covers 30% of the population, that is 1.6 million persons. Inside this region the Humanist Party is also present in the town of Copenhagen with 0.5 million inhabitants.

The Humanist Party ran two candidates.

References

External links
Official web site in Danish 
region of Denmark official site showing party

1987 establishments in Denmark
Denmark
Denmark
Political parties established in 1987
Political parties in Denmark